Joan Bennett ( Aline Frankau; 26 June 1896 – 20 July 1986), also known as Joan Frankau, was a British literary scholar and critic. She was a Fellow of Girton College, Cambridge, and a lecturer in English at the University of Cambridge from 1936 to 1964. She was among the "constellation of critics" called by the defence in the Lady Chatterley Trial of D. H. Lawrence.

Life and career
Bennett was the daughter of London cigar importer Arthur Frankau (1849-1904) and writer Julia Frankau (1859-1916).  Though she was known as Joan throughout her life, she was christened Aline.  She married the Cambridge literary historian Henry Stanley Bennett (1889-1972) in 1920.

Bennett was a life fellow of Girton College, Cambridge, and additionally a lecturer in English at the University of Cambridge from 1936 to 1964. She wrote one of the first critical studies of Virginia Woolf. She was awarded the Rose Mary Crawshay Prize by the British Academy in 1963 for her book Sir Thomas Brown: His Life and Achievement.

As one of the expert witnesses in the Lady Chatterley Trial, she helped counter the arguments of the prosecution by confirming Lawrence's reputation as a novelist, that the work was more than a description of sexual encounters, and that Lawrence's repeated use of ‘four-letter words’ were justified by literary intent. Bennett's mother had earlier been credited by Mrs Belloc Lowndes with having been "one of the very few to recognise the genius of D. H. Lawrence".

Works

Publications by Joan Bennett include—
 Four Metaphysical Poets – Donne, Herbert, Vaughan, Crashaw, Cambridge University Press 1934
 Virginia Woolf – Her Art as a Novelist, Cambridge University Press 1945
 George Eliot – Her Mind and her Art, Cambridge University Press 1948
 Sir Thomas Browne – "A Man of Achievement in Literature", Cambridge University Press 1962
 Five Metaphysical Poets – Donne, Herbert, Vaughan, Crashaw, Marvell, Cambridge University Press 1964

Further reading

C. H. Rolph (ed.), The Trial of Lady Chatterley: Regina v. Penguin Books Limited, Penguin Books 1961
Aryeh Newman, "From exile to exit: the Frankau Jewish connection", The Jewish Quarterly Vol. 34 No. 4 (128), 1987
Todd M. Endelman, "The Frankaus of London: A Study in Radical Assimilation, 1837-1967", Jewish History Vol. 8 Nos 1-2, 1994
Derek Brewer, A list of his writings presented to H. S. Bennett on his eightieth birthday, 15th January 1969, Cambridge University Press 1969

References and notes 

British academics of English literature
English Jews
1896 births
1986 deaths
Frankau family